The 1983–84 Syracuse Orangemen men's basketball team represented Syracuse University during the 1983–84 college basketball season.

Roster

Schedule

|-
!colspan=9 style=| Regular season

|-
!colspan=9 style=| Big East tournament

|-
!colspan=9 style=| NCAA tournament

References

Syracuse Orange
Syracuse Orange men's basketball seasons
Syracuse
Syracuse Orange
Syracuse Orange